Park Sang-Hee  (born 2 December 1987) is a South Korean footballer who plays as a midfielder.

External links 

1987 births
Living people
Association football midfielders
South Korean footballers
Seongnam FC players
Gimcheon Sangmu FC players
K League 1 players